Malik Najmul Hassan is a Pakistani politician who has been a member of Senate of Pakistan, since March 2012.

Political career
He was elected to the Senate of Pakistan as an independent candidate in 2012 Pakistani Senate election.

References

Living people
Pakistani senators (14th Parliament)
Year of birth missing (living people)